The Club de Fútbol Calor, commonly known as Calor, is a Mexican football club based in Monclova, Coahuila. The club was founded in 2001, and currently plays in the Serie B of Liga Premier.

History
The team was founded in 2001 under the name El Calor de San Pedro, based on San Pedro, Coahuila on Tercera División. The squad was created with the objective of training players from the Mexican-Canadian League, a local competition. In 2012, the team obtained the subchampionship of the Third Division, losing with Real Cuautitlán, however, their position allowed the team to be promoted to the Second Division.

In August 2012 the team debuted in the Liga de Nuevos Talentos, the second level of the Mexican Second Division, the team managed to maintain the category without many problems.

In July 2013 the club was moved to Gómez Palacio to stay in the category by not being able to meet the requirements at its original headquarters, and its name was changed to Calor de Gómez Palacio, the club had as a new field the Unidad Deportiva Francisco Gómez Palacio.

In the Torneo Clausura 2017, the team finished the competition as runner-up, after being defeated by the Yalmakán F.C.

In 2018 the team was moved to Monclova, being its third change of venue in the history of the team, also, the team was renamed as Club Calor. After the arrival of the club to its new city, the construction of a football stadium was planned.

During the 2020–2021 season, the team requested a one-year hiatus to undergo a financial and sports restructuring, due to the problems caused by COVID-19 in the Mexican football sector, in addition to improving their situation to be eligible for a place in the Liga Premier – Serie A.

In Summer 2021 the team returned to compete, at the end of the Torneo Apertura Club Calor reached the championship final, where they were defeated by Aguacateros C.D. Uruapan.

In the Apertura 2022, Club Calor won their first official championship by defeating Alebrijes de Oaxaca Premier by 3–2 on the aggregate.

Honors
Serie B de México Champions: 1
Apertura 2022

Players

Current squad

Reserve teams
Calor León
Reserve team that plays in the Liga TDP, the fourth level of the Mexican league system.

References

External links 

Association football clubs established in 2001
Football clubs in Coahuila
2001 establishments in Mexico
Liga Premier de México